The Eldredge was an American automobile manufactured from 1903 until 1906. A product of the National Sewing Machine Company of Belvidere, Illinois, it was a light, two-seater runabout with left-hand drive or two-row tonneau.

The 1904 Eldredge Runabout was a runabout model.  It could seat 2 passengers and sold for US$750.  The horizontal-mounted flat-2, situated at the center of the car, produced 8 hp (6 kW).  A 3-speed transmission was fitted.  The armored wood-framed car weighed 1150 lb (522 kg) and used platform springs.

The 1904 Eldredge Tonneau was a tonneau model.  It could seat 5 passengers and sold for US$2000.  The horizontal-mounted flat-4, situated at the front of the car, produced 16 hp (11.9 kW).  The angle steel-framed car weighed 2300 lb (1043 kg).  It was a modern touring car design with a cellular radiator (with fan), and semi-elliptic springs, but sold for far less than competing models.

References
 Frank Leslie's Popular Monthly (January, 1904)
 David Burgess Wise, The New Illustrated Encyclopedia of Automobiles.

Veteran vehicles
Motor vehicle manufacturers based in Illinois
Defunct motor vehicle manufacturers of the United States